Stewart Bart Farley is a retired American soccer goalkeeper who played professionally in the North American Soccer League and Major Indoor Soccer League.

A native of Williston, Vermont, Farley attended Williston Central School, Champlain Valley Union High School, and the University of Vermont where he was a 1978 Honorable Mention (third team) All American soccer player. He is a member of the Vermont Catamounts Hall of Fame.  In 1979, he signed with the Detroit Lightning of the  Major Indoor Soccer League. In 1980, he moved to the Detroit Express of the North American Soccer League.  He also served as an assistant coach with the University of Virginia.  He currently works for the Las Vegas Premier Soccer Club.
 
In December 1999, Sports Illustrated named him as one of the top 50 Vermont athletes.

References

External links
 NASL/MISL stats

Living people
American Soccer League (1933–1983) players
Detroit Express players
Detroit Lightning players
Major Indoor Soccer League (1978–1992) players
New England Sharks players
North American Soccer League (1968–1984) indoor players
North American Soccer League (1968–1984) players
Vermont Catamounts men's soccer players
Soccer players from Vermont
People from Hinesburg, Vermont
Soccer coaches from Vermont
American soccer players
Association football goalkeepers
Year of birth missing (living people)